SSPC may refer to:

 Samar State Polytechnic College, predecessor of the Samar State University in the Philippines
 Scottish School of Primary Care, an academic institution
 Slope Stability Probability Classification, a classification system for slope engineering
 Society for Protective Coatings, a professional organization for the industrial coatings industry
 Solid State Pharmaceutical Cluster, “Research Cluster”
 Southern Sudan Peace Commission, a government organization in South Sudan
 Statewide Suicide Prevention Council, an advisory body in Alaska